Savoir aimer is a 1997 album recorded by French singer Florent Pagny. It was his fifth album oversall and was released on 1 November 1997. It achieved huge success in France and Belgium (Wallonia), where it remained charted respectively for 84 and 64 weeks, including two weeks atop. To date it is Pagny's best-selling album, with over 1,5 million copies sold. It was led by the single "Savoir aimer", a number-one hit in both countries, and followed by "Chanter" (#16 in France, #15 in Belgium), "D'un amour l'autre" (#83 in France, limited edition) and "Dors" (#29 in France, #28 in Belgium). French artists Pascal Obispo, Zazie, Art Mengo and Jean-Jacques Goldman wrote at least one song of the album.

Track listing
 "Savoir aimer" (Lionel Florence, Pascal Obispo) — 4:40
 "Dors" (Erick Benzi) — 3:58
 "Sierra Cuadrada" (Jacques Veneruso) — 5:30
 "Mourir les yeux ouverts" (Didier Golemanas, Obispo) — 4:13
 "Loin de toi" (Veneruso) — 5:12
 "Une place pour moi" (Benzi, Jean-Jacques Goldman, J. Kapler) — 4:17
 "Protection" (Bruno Jardel, Peter Kingsberry, Dimitri Ticovoi) — 4:14
 "Combien ça va" (Zazie) — 3:44
 "Chanter" (Florence, Obispo) — 3:48
 "Sólo le pido a Dios" (Léon Gieco) — 4:17
 "D'un amour l'autre" (Patrice Guirao, Art Mengo) — 2:49

Source : Allmusic.

Charts

Certifications and sales

Releases

References

1997 albums
Florent Pagny albums
Mercury Records albums